First Lady of Austria is the title attributed to the wife (or, in place of a wife, a designee, such as a daughter) of the president of Austria. The current first lady is Doris Schmidauer, wife of President Alexander Van der Bellen, who has held the position since 26 January 2017.

First ladies of the Second Austrian Republic (1945–present)

References

Austria